Love Does Grow on Trees is a short comedy film written and directed by Bevan Walsh and produced by Geraldine Patten. The film stars Luke Ward-Wilkinson, El Krajewski and Tom Brooke.

Plot
The film is about a teenage boy whose life is thrown into chaos when he discovers adult magazines, girls and the embarrassment that goes with both.

Cast
Luke Ward-Wilkinson    ...     Danny
El Krajewski           ...     Milkshake Girl
Tom Brooke             ...     Saint Porn
Frank Cameron          ...     Danny's Friend
Petra Mahmood          ...     Newsagent
Gemma Ward-Wilkinson   ...     Young Mother
Victoria Keenan        ...     Young Mother

Accolades
Acclaimed by Danny Boyle at the British Independent Film Awards.
Named one of the top five shorts  at the Tribeca Film Festival by New York Magazine.
WINNER 'Best Newcomer - *Rushes Soho Shorts Festival.
WINNER 'Best Film & Best Comedy' – Super Shorts International Film Festival
WINNER 'Audience Award' – Film Brothers Festival of Shorts
WINNER 'Best Short' – LLV Film Festival.
WINNER 'Best Comedy' - Southern Appalachian International Film Festival
WINNER 'Best Supporting Actress' for El Krajewski – Maverick Movie Awards
NOMINATED 'Best British Short' - British Independent Film Awards.
FINALIST - Kodak Short Film Competition.
NOMINATED 'East Fresian Award' – Emden International Film Festival.
RUNNER UP 'Audience Award' – Williamstown Film Festival.
HONORABLE MENTION 'Best Narrative' – West Virginia Short Film Festival

References

External links 
Love Does Grow on Trees at Vimeo
Love Does Grow on Trees at BBC Film Network
Love Does Grow on Trees at IMDB
Love Does Grow on Trees trailer on YouTube
Love Does Grow on Trees at British Council website
Love Does Grow on Trees fan page on Facebook

2008 comedy films
2008 short films
2000s English-language films
British short films
British comedy films
2008 films
2000s British films